The 2015 Melanesian Super Cup was the 2nd edition of the Melanesian Super Cup. The tournament is held since 2014 and is a sign of the longtime friendship between Vanuatu and the Solomon Islands. The matches were played at the Port Vila Municipal Stadium in Port Vila, with tournament was played in round-robin format. The draw for the fixtures was held on 1 October 2015 at Port Vila, Vanuatu.

Teams 
The 4 teams participating in the cup are:
 Amicale
 Erakor Golden Star
 Solomon Warriors (title holders)
 Western United

Matches

All times UTC+14.

References

International association football competitions hosted by Vanuatu
2015–16 in OFC football
2015–16 in Vanuatuan football